Åselstad is a locality situated in Norrköping Municipality, Östergötland County, Sweden with 475 inhabitants in 2010.

References 

Populated places in Östergötland County
Populated places in Norrköping Municipality